The 2011 UNLV Rebels football team represented the University of Nevada, Las Vegas in the 2011 NCAA Division I FBS football season. The Rebels were led by second year head coach Bobby Hauck and played their home games at Sam Boyd Stadium. They are members of the Mountain West Conference. They finished the season 2–10, 1–6 in Mountain West play to finish in a three-way tie for sixth place.

Schedule

References

UNLV
UNLV Rebels football seasons
UNLV Rebels football